The Congo women's national football team represents the Congo in international football.

Congo took part in the first African Championship in 1991, but withdrew before the tournament began. Congo did not compete at another championship until the 2004 tournament, where they beat Equatorial Guinea, but lost to Cameroon in qualification. During the qualification for the 2006 African Championship, they beat Togo over two legs, but did not turn up for the second qualifying round match against Ghana.

First in the 2008 Championship, Congo qualified by beating the Democratic Republic of Congo in the final qualifying round. Congo then went on to a group with Equatorial Guinea, Cameroon and Mali. They finished the group with three points after a win against Mali, and defeats to good Equatorial Guinea and Cameroon sides.

Despite good performances in 2008, they did not qualify for the 2010 African Championship. Therefore, they cannot qualify for the 2011 Germany World Cup.

History

The beginning
The Congo women's national team played its first official match on May 30, 2004 in Malabo against Equatorial Guinea (draw 2–2). The Congolese women have participated in one African Women's Football Championship finals in 2006, where they were eliminated in the first round. The team has never participated in a World Cup or Olympic finals.

Team image

Home stadium
The Congo women's national football team plays their home matches on the Stade Alphonse Massemba-Débat.

Results and fixtures

The following is a list of match results in the last 12 months, as well as any future matches that have been scheduled.

2022

Source:  global archive

Coaching staff

History of Managers

 (−2022) Gabriel Dengaki
( 2022–)M.MBEMBA BERJONA

Players

Current squad
 The following players were named on 11 June 2022 for the International Friendly against .
 Caps and goals accurate up to and including 30 October 2021.

Recent call-ups
The following players have been called up to a Congo squad in the past 12 months.

Individual records

 Active players in bold, statistics correct as of 2020.

Most capped players

Top goalscorers

Achievements

Women's World Cup record

*Draws include knockout matches decided on penalty kicks.

Olympic Games

*Draws include knockout matches decided on penalty kicks.

African Women's Championship/Cup of Nations

African Games

UNIFFAC Women's Cup

Honours

Notes

References

External links

African women's national association football teams
women